Dirty Bomb is a 2011 Finnish comedy film written and directed by Elias Koskimies.

Cast
 Malla Malmivaara as Mirccu
 Jukka Puotila as Martin Bakka
 Ilkka Villi as Roba
 Iida Lampela as PD
 Niina Herala as Laura Melanie
 Jussi Vatanen as Jali

References

External links
 

2011 films
2011 comedy films
2010s Finnish-language films
Finnish comedy films